Battle of Albert (21–23 August 1918) was the third battle by that name fought during World War I, following the First Battle of Albert and the Second Battle of Albert, with each of the series of three being fought roughly two years apart. This smaller third battle was significant in that it was the opening push that would lead to the Second Battle of the Somme and involved the Australian Corps. This attack opened the advance; the main thrust was launched by the Third Army along with support from the Fourth Army. The Second Battle of Bapaume, from 25 August to 3 September, was a continuation of this battle.

The attacks developed into an advance, which pushed the German 2nd Army back along a  front line. On 22 August, the 18th (Eastern) Division took Albert, with the British and Americans advancing on Arras. The following day, the Australian 1st Division, which was advancing north-east from Proyart, attacked German fortifications around Chuignes, and succeeded in capturing the town.

On 29 August, during the Second Battle of Bapaume, the town of Bapaume fell into New Zealand hands. This resulted in an advance by the Australian Corps, who crossed the Somme River on 31 August and broke the German lines during the Battle of Mont St. Quentin. The  (German armies on the Western Front) was pushed back to the Hindenburg Line, from which they had launched their spring offensive.

Footnotes

References

External links
  Map of Allied Advance in World War I
 Hornby, M. Advance to Victory, 1918 (Western Front Association)

Battles of the Western Front (World War I)
1918 in France
Conflicts in 1918
History of Somme (department)
Battles of World War I involving Germany
Battles of World War I involving France
August 1918 events
France–Germany military relations